Pandit Jnan Prakash Ghosh (8 May 1909 – 18 February 1997) often known as 'Guru' Jnan Prakash Ghosh was an Indian harmonium and tabla player from Farukhabad gharana of Hindustani classical music and musicologist.

Early life and background
Born in a Hindu family with musical background in Kolkata, he was the grandson of Dwarkanath Ghosh (1847–1928), who founded Dwarkin in 1875 and invented the "Dwarkin harmonium", popular in West Bengal, India. He graduated from the Scottish Church College of the University of Calcutta He was keen in sports (he played soccer, hockey, polo and billiards). He also practised painting, but had to discontinue these due to an eye injury in a soccer match.

Then he turned to music. He was trained in vocals by Girija Shankar, Mohammed Sagir Khan and Mohammed Dabir Khan. He took tabla lessons from Masit Khan of the Farukhabad gharana and became his senior disciple

Career

He was the founder of Sourav Academy of Music and closely associated with the 'Sangeet Research Academy'. He scored music for many Bengali films, of which Jadubhatta, Andhare Alo and Rajlakshmi o Srikanta (1958) are worth mentioning. He has composed and directed music to a number of popular gramophone records sung by various artistes. A percussion entitled The Drums of India 

He also provided music for the Academy Award nominated animated short Bead Game, directed by Ishu Patel for the National Film Board of Canada. His residence at 25 Dixon Lane in Bowbazar, Kolkata, was frequented by musicians, be it local or those visiting the city, and thus was the venue of several recitals, most notably a Raga Chhayanat performed by Bade Ghulam Ali Khan in 1954.

Amongst his students are tabla players Kanai Dutta, Shyamal Bose, Shankar Ghosh, Anindo Chatterjee, and Nikhil Ghosh, Rajkumar Misra, singers Prasun Banerjee, Ajoy Chakrabarty, Suman Ghosh and Arun Bhaduri, and instrumentalist Paul Grant. His birth centenary was celebrated on 7 May 2012, in Kolkata, with screening of documentary of him and performances by various singers.

Discography

 1968 – Drums of India, Vol. 1 – Gramophone
 1979 – Drums of India, Vol. 2 Gramophone
 1993 – Raga on Keyboard – EMI
 2004 – Dhun – Saregama
 2004 – Raag Charukeshi – Saregama
 2004 – Raag Haripriya – Saregama
 2004 – Raag Jhinjhoti – Saregama
 2004 – Raag Mishra Kalengra – Saregama
 2004 – Raag Shyam Kalyan

Awards and recognition
In 1974, he was awarded the Sangeet Natak Akademi Fellowship the highest honour conferred by the Sangeet Natak Akademi, India's National Academy of Music, Dance & Drama. This was followed by the Padma Bhushan in 1984, given by the Government of India

References

External links
 
 Jnan Prakash Ghosh at last.fm

1909 births
1997 deaths
Hindustani instrumentalists
Indian male classical musicians
Musicians from Kolkata
Scottish Church College alumni
University of Calcutta alumni
Indian musicologists
Tabla players
Indian film score composers
Recipients of the Padma Bhushan in arts
Recipients of the Sangeet Natak Akademi Fellowship
Indian music educators
Indian percussionists
Bengali people
20th-century Indian composers
20th-century drummers
20th-century Indian male singers
20th-century Indian singers
20th-century musicologists
Indian male film score composers